Hòa Hội may refer to several places in Vietnam, including:

 Hòa Hội, Bà Rịa-Vũng Tàu, a rural commune of Xuyên Mộc District
 , a rural commune of Phú Hòa District
 , a rural commune of Châu Thành District